Gunfighters of the Northwest is a 1954 American Western serial film directed by Spencer Gordon Bennet and Charles S. Gould and starring Jock Mahoney, Clayton Moore, Phyllis Coates, Don C. Harvey.

Plot
White Horse Rebels, under the command of a mystery villain known only as The Leader, attempt to create an independent White Horse Republic in Canada's northwest. Funded by gold from the Marrow Mine, they attack Canadian settlements in the area. The North-West Mounted Police, represented primarily by hero Sgt. Ward and his sidekick Constable Nevin, discover The Leader's real identity. An added complication comes in the form of First Nations, Blackfeet driven into Canada from the United States, who attack both sides and whom the rebels attempt to use as scapegoats for their own attacks.

Production
The entire filming of Gunfighters of the Northwest took place outdoors at Big Bear Lake, California, including a scene set in a cave that was filmed with lighting and backdrop to make it appear to be an internal shot. During filming, the cast and crew all lived at a nearby hotel.

The two heroic leads, Jock Mahoney and Clayton Moore, were injured during production. On the second day of shooting, Moore was thrown from his horse, landing unconscious on his back. He was not able to perform any rising scenes for a few days but could act in all the dramatic scenes. Mahoney was hurt on the same day, injuring a metatarsal in a fight scene, but he was able to walk and continue filming the next day.

Moore had been the Lone Ranger in the television series until being replaced by John Hart in 1952. Hart, who was dating female lead Phyllis Coates, visited the set. Following Moore's injury, Hart volunteered to stand in for Moore in several scenes.

Cast
 Jock Mahoney as Sgt. Joe Ward (as Jack Mahoney)
 Clayton Moore as Constable Bram Nevin
 Phyllis Coates as Rita Carville
 Don C. Harvey as Otis Green (as Don Harvey)
 Marshall Reed as Gale Lynch
 Rodd Redwing as Bear Tooth
 Lyle Talbot as Inspector Wheeler
 Tommy Farrell as Constable Arch Perry - Ch's 1-2
 Terry Frost as Wildfoot
 Lee Roberts as Arnold Reed - Ch's 1-2
 Joseph Allen as Fletcher Stone (as Joe Allen Jr.)
 Gregg Barton as Hank Bridger
 Chief Yowlachie as Chief Running Elk
 Pierce Lyden as Dakota

Chapter titles
 A Trap for the Mounties
 Indian War Drums
 Between Two Fires
 Midnight Raiders
 Running the Gauntlet
 Mounties at Bay
 Plunge of Peril
 Killer at Large
 The Fighting Mounties
 The Sergeant Gets His Man
 The Fugitive Escapes
 Stolen Gold
 Perils of the Mounted Police
 Surprise Attack
 Trail's End

See also
 List of American films of 1954
 List of film serials by year
 List of film serials by studio

References

External links

Cinefania.com

1954 films
1950s English-language films
American black-and-white films
Northern (genre) films
Columbia Pictures film serials
Films directed by Spencer Gordon Bennet
Royal Canadian Mounted Police in fiction
1954 Western (genre) films
Films set in the Northwest Territories
Films with screenplays by George H. Plympton
American Western (genre) films
1950s American films